Pyrophyllon subtumens is an obligate red algal epiphyte of Durvillaea southern bull-kelp, and is endemic to New Zealand.

Taxonomy
The species belongs to a monotypic genus, which is sister to Childophyllon - a genus containing another red algal epiphyte of other seaweeds in New Zealand. The species was previously recognised as Porphyra subtumens before being reclassified.

Description
The species can be found growing on all mainland New Zealand species of Durvillaea.

References

Red algae
Flora of New Zealand